In graph theory, the Lovász number of a graph is a real number that is an upper bound on the Shannon capacity of the graph. This quantity was first introduced by László Lovász in his 1979 paper On the Shannon Capacity of a Graph.

Accurate numerical approximations to this number can be computed in polynomial time by semidefinite programming and the ellipsoid method.
It is sandwiched between the chromatic number and clique number of any graph, and can be used to compute these numbers on graphs for which they are equal, including perfect graphs.

Definition 
Let  be a graph on  vertices.

Depending on the graph it might be possible to take  considerably smaller than the number of vertices .

The Lovász number  of graph  is defined as follows:

Here minimization implicitly is performed also over the dimension , however without loss of generality it suffices to consider .

Equivalent expressions 
Let  be a graph on  vertices.

The following method is dual to the previous one. Let  be the  matrix of ones. Then

The Lovász number can be computed also in terms of the complement graph . Then

Value for well-known graphs 

The Lovász number has been computed for the following graphs:

Properties 

with equality if  is vertex-transitive.

Lovász "sandwich theorem" 

The Lovász "sandwich theorem" states that the Lovász number always lies between two other numbers that are NP-complete to compute. More precisely,

The value of  can be formulated as a semidefinite program and numerically approximated by the ellipsoid method in time bounded by a polynomial in the number of vertices of G.

Relation to Shannon capacity 
The Shannon capacity of graph  is defined as follows:

Clearly, . However, the Lovász number provides an upper bound on the Shannon capacity of graph, hence

For example, let the confusability graph of the channel be , a pentagon. It was first established by  that .

Clearly, . However, since "11", "23", "35", "54", "42" are five mutually non-confusable messages (forming a five-vertex independent set in the strong square of ), thus .

To show that this bound is tight, let  be the following orthonormal representation of the pentagon:

and let . By using this choice in the initial definition of Lovász number, we get . Hence, .

However, there exist graphs for which the Lovász number and Shannon capacity differ, so the Lovász number cannot in general be used to compute exact Shannon capacities.

Quantum physics

The Lovász number has been generalized for "non-commutative graphs" in the context of quantum communication. The Lovasz number also arises in quantum contextuality in an attempt to explain the power of quantum computers.

See also
Tardos function, a monotone approximation to the Lovász number of the complement graph that can be computed in polynomial time and has been used to prove lower bounds in circuit complexity

Notes

References

External links 

Graph invariants
Information theory